Oleh Olegovych Kroka (also Oleg Kryoka, ; born January 17, 1987, in Dnipropetrovsk) is an amateur Ukrainian Greco-Roman wrestler, who played for the men's heavyweight category. Kryoka represented Ukraine at the 2008 Summer Olympics in Beijing, where he competed for the men's 96 kg class. He lost the qualifying round match to Turkish wrestler and Olympic bronze medalist Mehmet Özal, with a three-set technical score (2–4, 2–1, 1–1), and a classification point score of 1–3.

References

External links
Profile – International Wrestling Database
NBC Olympics Profile

Ukrainian male sport wrestlers
1987 births
Living people
Olympic wrestlers of Ukraine
Wrestlers at the 2008 Summer Olympics
Sportspeople from Dnipro
21st-century Ukrainian people